The Mystery of the Whisper (1999) is an album by The Crüxshadows. This release continues to include songs chronicling "The Angel IV Cycle". The album was remastered and reissued in 2006 as a 2-disc version with the out of print Until the Voices Fade... EP.

Monument quotes from the poem 'La Belle Dame sans Merci: A Ballad' by John Keats.

Track listing
"Isis & Osiris (Life/Death)"
"Cruelty"
"Leave Me Alone"
"Insomnia"
"Breathe"
"Regrets"
"Confusion"
"Sympathy (For Tomorrow)"
"Aten-Ra"
"'Do You Believe...'"
"Heaven's Gaze"
"Heart on My Sleeve"
"'There Are Some Secrets...'"
"Nothing"
"Even Angels Fall"
"MONUMENT"
"Death/Reunite"

1999 albums
The Crüxshadows albums